Precious Blood Secondary School, Riruta is located in Kawangware, Dagoretti constituency in Nairobi county, Kenya. It is about 7 km to the West from the city center. It has a population of about 600 students drawn from every corner of the country. The school has three streams in every form. It is sited on a ten-acre plot and consists of class rooms, hostels, dining hall, a small field for sport, teachers' quarters, laboratories and staff rooms. It is among top performing school in Kenya

The Catholic nuns of the order of Precious Blood Sisters established the school in 1964. Its enrollment was meant for children of indigenous from the immediate vicinity of Kawangware, Riruta and Uthiru who had been affected by the Mau-Mau struggle.

It is a public school run by the Kenyan Government, The Precious Blood Sisters, Board of Governors and The PTA.
The school started as a single stream school but today it has four streams. The students are about 900. Initially it was not a boarding school but with the increasing numbers it was expanded and dormitories were made.

References

Schools in Nairobi
High schools and secondary schools in Kenya